Tibor Palánkai (born 1 March 1938) is a Hungarian economist, university teacher and member of the Hungarian Academy of Sciences. He has been awarded the Jean Monnet prize and multiple Hungarian awards. He was the vice-rector of the Karl Marx University of Economics between 1977 and 1983 and the rector of Budapest University of Economic Sciences between 1997 and 2000. He is an emeritus professor since 2008.

Professional Work 

His fields of research include economics, macro-economics, world economics and international integration and European studies. He has received the Jean Monnet prize from the European commission for his pioneering role in European integration studies.

One of his focus is the integration of Hungary into the European Union. He authored multiple books on this topic.

He has published more than 150 scientific publications.

Awards 

Hungarian Academy awards (1994)
Order of Merit of the Hungarian Republic (1998)
Ferenc Deák research award (1999)
Gyula Kautz award (2008)
Szécheny award (2009)
Jean Monnet prize (2010)

References

External links
Biography from ISES

Academic staff of the Corvinus University of Budapest